Hajji Baba Khan or Hajji Babakhan may refer to:
 Hajji Baba Khan, Ardabil, a village in Qeshlaq-e Sharqi Rural District, Ardabil Province
 Hajji Babakhan, Sistan and Baluchestan, a village in Dust Mohammad Rural District